Kenneth Roberts may refer to:

Sportspeople
 Ken Roberts (footballer, born 1925) (1925–2008), Australian rules footballer for Richmond
 Ken Roberts (footballer, born 1936) (1936–2021), Welsh football player and manager
 Ken Roberts (footballer, born 1952), Australian rules footballer for Essendon and Melbourne
 Ken Roberts (rugby league) (1937–2017), English rugby league footballer of the 1950s, 1960s and 1970s
 Ken Roberts (baseball) (born 1988), baseball player
 Kenny Roberts (born 1951), former world champion motorcycle racer
 Kenny Roberts Jr. (born 1975), former world champion motorcycle racer and son of Kenny Roberts
 Kenny Roberts (swimmer) (born 1978), Seychellois swimmer

Writers
 Ken Roberts (author) (born 1946), Canadian children's writer
 Kenneth Roberts (author) (1885–1957), American author of historical novels

Politicians
 Kenneth A. Roberts (1912–1989), U.S. Representative from Alabama
 Ken Roberts (politician) (born 1953), Republican Idaho State Representative

Others
 Ken Roberts (announcer) (1910–2009), American radio and television announcer
 Ken Roberts (promoter) (1941–2014), concert promoter and owner of influential Los Angeles radio station KROQ-FM
 Kenny Roberts (musician) (1926–2012), country music performer